Chantal Margarita Brunner  (born 5 November 1970) is a New Zealand sprinter and long jumper. She was born in Wellington. Her personal best jump is 6.68 metres, achieved in March 1997 in Melbourne.

Brunner captured altogether seventeen national titles, nine in the long jump event, six in the 100 m sprint and two in the 200 m event.

Achievements

References

New Zealand Champions

1970 births
Living people
New Zealand female sprinters
New Zealand female long jumpers
Athletes (track and field) at the 1996 Summer Olympics
Athletes (track and field) at the 2000 Summer Olympics
Olympic athletes of New Zealand
Athletes (track and field) at the 1994 Commonwealth Games
Athletes (track and field) at the 1998 Commonwealth Games
Athletes (track and field) at the 2002 Commonwealth Games
Athletes (track and field) at the 2006 Commonwealth Games
Athletes from Wellington City
Competitors at the 1993 Summer Universiade
Competitors at the 2001 Goodwill Games
Commonwealth Games competitors for New Zealand